Paul Cornell (August 5, 1822 – March 3, 1904) was an American lawyer and Chicago real estate speculator who founded  the Hyde Park Township that included most of what are now known as the south and far southeast sides of Chicago in Cook County, Illinois, United States.  He turned the south side Lake Michigan lakefront area, especially the Hyde Park community area and neighboring Kenwood and Woodlawn neighborhoods, into a resort community that had its heyday from the 1850s through the early 20th century.  He was also an urban planner who paved the way for and preserved many of the parks that are now in the Chicago Park District.  Additionally, he was a successful entrepreneur with interests in manufacturing, cemeteries, and hotels.

His modern legacy includes several large parks now in the Chicago Park District:  Jackson Park, Washington Park, Midway Plaisance and Harold Washington Park.  Most of the South and Southeast Sides of Chicago were developed and eventually annexed into the City of Chicago as a result of his foresight.

Background
Born in Upstate New York, Cornell was from a distinguished New England family, was descendant from Thomas Cornell, the progenitor of the Cornell family in North America, and a cousin to Ezra Cornell, founder of Cornell University. When his father died (he was 9 at that time) the family moved to the Adams County, IL/Schuyler County, IL area, where he worked as a farmhand to pay for schooling. He passed the Illinois bar examination and moved to Chicago in 1847.  Unfortunately, his entire savings was stolen from his hotel room on his first night in town.  A sympathetic lawyer provided him with both a loan and a job at the law office of Skinner and Hoyne, where he met Senator Stephen Douglas.

He was married to the sister-in-law of John Evans, after whom Evanston, IL was named.  He had many strong local connections, being related to founders of Northwestern University (Evans and Orrington Lunt) and to George Kimbark of Riverside Improvement Company.  His brother-in-law Kimbark purchased the area between 51st and 55th and Dorchester and Woodlawn to the west of Cornell's purchase.  Cornell later purchased this as well as other lands purchased by his uncle, Hassan A. Hopkins, to add to Hyde Park.

Hyde Park

Douglas advised him to consider investing in  land south of the city limits. After some horseback travels through the area, he began to envision a viable community there. In 1853, following the advice of Douglas, he bought  of property between 51st Street and 55th Street as a speculative investment. In the 1850s, Chicago was still a walkable urban area well contained within a  radius of the center. It was common for development companies to locate hotels near rail depots to introduce visitors to new suburbs. In 1856, Paul Cornell invented the Chicago railroad suburb. In an effort to improve his land value, he deeded  to the Illinois Central Railroad in exchange for a 53rd Street train station and a commitment of 6 daily connections to Chicago's Central Depot in each direction. He then marketed the neighborhood to wealthy Chicagoans as a resort area. He selected the name Hyde Park to associate the area with the elite high class neighborhoods of New York and London.

At about the same time, he built the Hyde Park House a 4-story hotel at 53rd Street and Lake Michigan.  The hotel became the focal point of the community and drew affluent guests with leisure time and discretionary income.  This site is now occupied by the Hampton House.  The hotel also helped others to envision a thriving affluent community in the area.  By 1861, the residents petitioned the Illinois General Assembly to create the Hyde Park Township.

Paul Cornell specifically forbade heavy industry development in Hyde Park.  He maintained the character of Hyde Park, which was intended to be an elite suburb bordering Chicago, by selling only large lots that the affluent could afford.  The neighborhood flourished for the next two generations.

In 1889, the entire Hyde Park township (the area south of 39th Street, north of 138th Street, and east of State Street), which had quintupled in population from an 1880 population of 15,716 to an 1889 population of 85,000, voted for annexation to the City of Chicago. Paul Cornell planned and advocated a town with a lakefront park, a plaisance, an adjoining park and boulevards shaped the town.  His plan for a cornerstone institution to rival Evanston's Northwestern University was at first thwarted by the decision to establish a theological seminary on the north side, but would come to fruition with the foundation of the University of Chicago through the philanthropy of John D. Rockefeller and Marshall Field in 1890.

Hyde Park maintained racially restrictive covenants excluding African Americans from purchasing, leasing, or occupying homes in Hyde Park for nearly one hundred years until this segregative tool was struck down by the United States Supreme Court in a 1940 case, Lee v. Hansberry, concerning the nearby Washington Park Subdivision.  At his death, Cornell bequeathed East End Park (Now renamed Harold Washington Park) to the city.  The stone pictured above commemorates this gift.

Civic leadership
Cornell is considered the "father of the South Parks System" for his extensive efforts after the American Civil War to create a parks system south of Chicago.  Cornell, as a real estate developer, presented a convincing case to city developers that a parks system would increase the value of land surrounding it.  Cornell based his arguments on New York City's Central Park, which had substantially raised surrounding real estate values.  Repeated attempts eventually got a plan through the Illinois General Assembly.  As a civic leader he along with his peer William Le Baron Jenney, the West Parks commissioner, commissioned urban landscape designers such as Frederick Law Olmsted, Calvert Vaux, Ossian Simonds, H. W. S. Cleveland, and Jens Jensen to create landscaped cemeteries, to implement a coordinated parks and boulevard system and to design the railroad-served suburbs to complement urban civilization.

In 1869, the state passed the "Parks Law", which created the north, south and west parks district.    The parks districts were established as municipal corporations with funding based on the taxable real estate within its service area.  The legislation provided for orderly growth and evolution of the city by outlining not only the powers and duties of the parks districts, but also the geography of the parks and connecting boulevards.  Cornell was able to both benefit financially from the $46 million spent on the parks during the remainder of the century and to assume a position of influence over the parks.   Cornell served for over 13 years on the South Parks Commission, which regulated parks south of the city.  This position enabled him to pursue his vision which was to have a park system that would give "lungs to the great city and its future generations."  He also served as the Hyde Park Township's first Town Supervisor.  Today, Jackson Park, Washington Park and Harold Washington Park stand as a testament to his efforts.  These parks became major selling points that contributed to the growth of Hyde Park.

Other ventures

In 1887, Cornell built the Hyde Park Hotel (left, 1887–1963) on the former site of his home at Lake Park and East Hyde Park Boulevard.  The hotel was expanded in 1891.  In 1914, the hotel expanded (for a second time), which doubled its capacity to 300 rooms (see right).

He subdivided parcels for sale through the 1870s. The area, which was first named Cornell, became Grand Crossing. He had accumulated a total of  land at one point. The reason that the name was changed was the pre-existence of Cornell, Illinois.

Paul Cornell established the Cornell Watch Factory at 76th Street and the Illinois Central tracks in 1876 in Grand Crossing. Among his other ventures, Cornell founded Republic Life Insurance Company and the American Bronze Company. He served as secretary for a group of Chicagoans who purchased  in 1853 to create Oak Woods Cemetery.

Memorials
Cornell Avenue running at along the 1600 east block from 4818 south to 9326 south and Cornell Drive running along the 1632 east block in Jackson Park.  Although these streets have different names they are the same street.
The Hyde Park Historical Society gives out annual Paul Cornell Awards.

Notes

References
Pacyga, Dominic A. and Ellen Skerrett, Chicago: City of Neighborhoods, 1986 Loyola University Press

1822 births
1904 deaths
Lawyers from Chicago
American people of English descent
Cornell family
People from White Creek, New York
Businesspeople from Chicago